Gath can refer to:
 Gath (surname)
 Gath (city), the biblical city and home of Goliath. Main site is Gath of the Philistines, but there are also other locations Gath Gittaim and Gath Carmel
Gath-hepher, a border town in ancient Israel
 Gath (magazine), the successor to Gairm, the most significant Scottish Gaelic magazine for its longevity and range
Gath & Chaves, an Argentine luxury department store
 The pen name of journalist George Alfred Townsend
 G.A.T.H is the acronym for the American band Gregory and the Hawk
 A fictional nation-state in the TV series Kings, based on the biblical city
 GATH is an abbreviation for the "Georgia Theatre" in Athens, Georgia, a mid-size concert venue near the University of Georgia campus where many famous acts have played.